Fixed Ideals is the second studio album by British band Muncie Girls. It was released on 31 August 2018 through Specialist Subject Records.

Critical reception
Fixed Ideals was met with "generally favorable" reviews from critics. At Metacritic, which assigns a weighted average rating out of 100 to reviews from mainstream publications, this release received an average score of 80 based on 7 reviews. Aggregator Album of the Year gave the release a 78 out of 100 based on a critical consensus of 14 reviews.

Accolades

Track listing

References

2018 albums
Muncie Girls albums